South Morang railway station is located on the Mernda line in Victoria, Australia. It serves the north-eastern Melbourne suburb of South Morang, and opened on 22 April 2012.

History
The first station on the site was Rail Motor Stopping Place No. 39, at the McDonalds Road level crossing on the former Whittlesea line, with a South Morang station a short distance further on. In its final years of operation, the passenger service was provided by a diesel electric railmotor (DERM).

On 29 November 1959, the Victorian Railways closed the line north of Lalor, following the electrification of the line from Reservoir to Lalor. The line to Epping was electrified and re-opened on 29 November 1964, and the remaining section of track from Epping to Whittlesea dismantled, although the former right-of-way was left intact.

Following the election of the Bracks State Government in October 1999, a promise was made to restore the rail service to South Morang by 2003. In 2004, it was decided a bus service would be introduced instead and, in May 2006, the original promise of restoring the railway was delayed until 2021. As a result of continued community pressure by the South Morang Rail Alliance, a coalition of community groups in the area, then Premier, John Brumby, announced in 2008 that construction of the extension would be brought forward to 2010, as part of the Victorian Transport Plan.

The Epping line was extended to the site of Rail Motor Stopping Place No. 39, on the border of South Morang and Mill Park, about two kilometres short of the original South Morang station. On 22 April 2012, the new station was opened to the public. As part of the extension project, five kilometres of track was duplicated between Keon Park and Epping, a second platform built at Thomastown, and a grade separation project at Epping included the construction of a new station there.

Provision was for the new line to be extended further northwards to Mernda and, on 26 August 2018, an extension to Mernda opened.

Platforms and services
South Morang has one island platform with two faces. It is served by Mernda line trains.

Platform 1:
  all stations and limited express services to Flinders Street

Platform 2:
  all stations services to Mernda

Transport links
Dysons operates seven routes via South Morang station, under contract to Public Transport Victoria:
 : Whittlesea – Northland Shopping Centre
 : Mill Park Lakes Palisades Estate – University Hill
 : Mernda station – RMIT University Bundoora Campus
 : Mernda station – RMIT University Bundoora Campus
 : to RMIT University Bundoora Campus
 : to Pacific Epping
 : to Pacific Epping

Kinetic Melbourne operates one SmartBus route via South Morang station, under contract to Public Transport Victoria:
  : Frankston station – Melbourne Airport

Gallery

References

External links
 
 South Morang extension project gallery

Premium Melbourne railway stations
Railway stations in Melbourne
Railway stations in Australia opened in 2012
Railway stations in the City of Whittlesea